|}

The Tingle Creek Chase is a Grade 1 National Hunt steeplechase in Great Britain which is open to horses aged four years or older. It is run at Sandown Park over a distance of about 2 miles (1 mile 7 furlongs and 119 yards, or 3,126 metres), and during its running there are thirteen fences to be jumped. The race is scheduled to take place each year in early December.

The event was first run in 1969 as the Benson & Hedges Gold Cup before being renamed the Mecca Bookmakers' Handicap Chase and then the Tingle Creek Handicap Chase in 1979, in honour of Tingle Creek, a popular National Hunt racehorse in the 1970s. Tingle Creek had a particularly good record in races at Sandown Park, winning the Sandown Park Pattern Handicap Chase three times amongst his 23 wins over obstacles in Britain and, in 1973, taking the race eventually named after him. The Tingle Creek Chase has been a Grade I race since 1994. Prior to 1994 it was run as a handicap race.

Records
Most successful horse (3 wins):
 Flagship Uberalles – 1999, 2000, 2001

Leading jockey (5 wins):
 Richard Dunwoody – Lefrak City (1985), Waterloo Boy (1991, 1992), Sound Man (1995, 1996)

Leading trainer (12 wins):
 Paul Nicholls – Flagship Uberalles (1999), Cenkos (2002), Kauto Star (2005, 2006), Twist Magic (2007, 2009), Master Minded (2008, 2010), Dodging Bullets (2014), Politologue (2017, 2020), Greaneteen (2021)

Winners since 1979

See also
 Horse racing in Great Britain
 List of British National Hunt races

References

 Racing Post:

 pedigreequery.com – Tingle Creek Chase – Sandown.

External links
 Race Recordings

National Hunt races in Great Britain
Sandown Park Racecourse
National Hunt chases
Recurring sporting events established in 1969
1969 establishments in England